Keegan Pereira may refer to:

Keegan Pereira (field hockey) (born 1991), Canadian field hockey player
Keegan Pereira (footballer) (born 1987), Indian footballer